The 2016 Soul Train Music Awards was  held at the Orleans Arena in Las Vegas, Nevada, on November 6, 2016. It was later aired on Centric and BET on November 27, 2016. The ceremony, hosted by Erykah Badu for the second year in a row, honored artists in 12 different categories. Drake was the most nominated artist with twelve, followed by Beyoncé (10) and Rihanna (8). During the ceremony american singer and songwriter Brandy was honored with the Lady of Soul Award for her contributions to the music industry. Teddy Riley was recognized by the Legend Award for his successful songwriting and music producing works.

Special awards

Legend Award
 Teddy Riley

Lady of Soul Award
 Brandy

Winners and nominees
Winners are listed first and highlighted in bold.

Album of the Year
 Beyoncé – Lemonade
 DJ Khaled – Major Key
 Drake – Views
 Rihanna – Anti
 Bryson Tiller – T R A P S O U L
 Kanye West – The Life of Pablo

Song of the Year
 Beyoncé – "Formation"
 Adele – "Hello"
 Drake – "Controlla"
 Rihanna  – "Work"
 Bryson Tiller – "Don't"

Video of the Year
 Beyoncé – "Formation"
 Beyoncé – "Sorry"
 Drake – "Hotline Bling"
 Rihanna  – "Work"
 Kanye West – "Fade"

The Ashford & Simpson Songwriter's Award
 Andra Day – "Rise Up"
 Written by: Andra Day and Jennifer Decilveo
 Adele – "Hello"
 Written by: Adele and Greg Kurstin
 Beyoncé – "Formation"
 Written by: Michael Len Williams II, Beyoncé, Khalif Brown, Jordan Frost and Asheton Hogan
 Rihanna – "Needed Me"
 Written by: Nick Audino, Rachel Derrus, Adam Feeney, Rihanna, Brittany Hazzard, Charles Hinshaw, Lewis Hughes, Dijon McFarlane, Khaled Rohaim, Te Whiti Warbrick
 Bryson Tiller – "Don't"
 Written by: Johntá Austin, Mariah Carey, Bryan-Michael Cox, Jermaine Dupri, Tavoris Hollins, Jr., Isom Brandon Stewart and Bryson Tiller

Best R&B/Soul Male Artist
 Maxwell
 Anthony Hamilton
 Bryson Tiller
 Usher
 The Weeknd

Best R&B/Soul Female Artist
 Beyoncé
 Fantasia
 Alicia Keys
 Rihanna
 Jill Scott

Best New Artist
 Chance the Rapper
 Andra Day
 Ro James
 Tory Lanez
 
 Bryson Tiller

Centric Certified Award
 Anderson .Paak
 After 7
 Bilal
 Lalah Hathaway
 Musiq Soulchild

Rhythm & Bars Award
 Fat Joe and Remy Ma  – "All the Way Up"
 Chance the Rapper  – "No Problem"
 DJ Khaled  – "For Free"
 Drake – "Controlla"
 Drake  – "One Dance"

Best Gospel/Inspirational Song
 Kirk Franklin – "123 Victory"
 Travis Greene – "Made a Way"
 Tamela Mann – "God Provides"
 Donnie McClurkin – "I Need You"
 Hezekiah Walker – "Better"

Best Dance Performance
 Kanye West  – "Fade"
 Beyoncé – "Formation"
 Drake – "Hotline Bling"
 Rihanna  – "Work"
 Usher  – "No Limit"

Best Collaboration
 Fat Joe and Remy Ma  – "All the Way Up"
 Beyoncé  – "Freedom"
 Chance the Rapper  – "No Problem"
 DJ Khaled  – "For Free"
 Rihanna  – "Work"

References

2016 in American music
2016
2016 awards in the United States
2016 music awards
2016 in Nevada
November 2016 events in the United States
Soul Train Music Awards 2016